Potholes Provincial Park is a park in Algoma District, Ontario, Canada, located  east of the community of Wawa. It can be accessed via Ontario Highway 101.

References

External links
Official Park Website

Provincial parks of Ontario
Parks in Algoma District
1985 establishments in Ontario